Eduardo Israel Kahn Gómez (born December 1, 1988), known as Israel Kahn, is a Peruvian footballer who plays as an attacking midfielder for Peruvian Primera División club Real Garcilaso.

Club career
Kahn made his Peruvian First Division league debut on February 14, 2010 in the first round of the 2010 season. The manager at the time, Teddy Cardama, allowed him to play the entire match for his debut, which contributed to Alianza Atlético's 2–1 win over Cienciano del Cuzco. In round 11 that season, Kahn scored his first Peruvian First Division league goal on April 25, 2010 away to Universitario de Deportes in the Monumental. He scored his goal in the 51st minute, but it was not enough as Raúl Ruidíaz scored the winner for the home team resulting in a 2–1 loss for Alianza Atlético.

On 11 January 2019 it was confirmed, that Kahn had signed for Peruvian Primera División club Real Garcilaso.

References

External links

1988 births
Living people
Footballers from Lima
Peruvian people of German descent
Association football wingers
Peruvian footballers
Real Garcilaso footballers
Universidad Técnica de Cajamarca footballers
Unión Huaral footballers
Alianza Atlético footballers
Juan Aurich footballers
Club Alianza Lima footballers
Club Deportivo Universidad César Vallejo footballers
Peruvian Primera División players